Steven V. Angelo (born June 8, 1952 in Somerville, Massachusetts) is a former state representative and Town Manager.

Early life
Angelo was elected to Town Meeting in 1971 while he was still in college. Following his graduation, Angelo worked as a teacher in the Saugus, Massachusetts school system, teaching history and law.

In 1978, he challenged thirty year incumbent Belden Bly for the 9th Essex District seat in the Massachusetts House of Representatives. He lost by only 318 votes.

In 1980, Bly did not run for re-election and Angelo once again ran for the seat. He defeated Lawrence Means and Christie Serino for the Democratic nomination and defeated Republican Clayton Trefry in the general election.

State Representative
While in the House he served as the House Chairman of the Natural Resources and Agriculture Committee (1985–1996), and the Government Regulations Committee (1995–1996).

Angelo co-authored the Solid Waste Law which mandated that acid gas scrubbers be placed on the incinerator in Saugus. The law also began what became the state's curbside recycling program.

Additionally, he pushed through laws on Acid Rain, Massachusetts State Revolving Fund, Wildlife Under the Wetlands, Hazardous Waste, Land Stamp, Tidelands, Open Space Acquisition, Underground Petroleum Storage, and the Cape Cod Commission. He served as Chairman of the Special Commission on Hazardous Waste, the Special Commission on Low Level Radioactive Waste, and the Special Commission on Solid Waste.

Angelo receive Legislator of the Year awards and special awards from many organizations including the Massachusetts Municipal Association, US Conservation Service, Massachusetts Audubon, the Environmental League of Massachusetts, Massachusetts Lobstermen's Association, Massachusetts Marine Trade Association, the MSPCA, Bay State Gas Retailer's Association, Massachusetts Conservation Commissions, Massachusetts Association of Private schools, and many others.

Although in House leadership for twelve years, Angelo resigned his position when he was on the losing side of a leadership fight (1996) which resulted in the election of Thomas Finneran as House Speaker. Although he was re-elected in 1996 and 1998, Angelo was not again to serve in House leadership due to conflicts with Finneran and his new leadership team.

1978 Democratic primary for the Massachusetts House of Representatives, 9th Essex District
Steven Angelo - 2,507 (53.5%)
Michael J. Serino - 2,170 (46.5%)

1978 General Election for the Massachusetts House of Representatives, 9th Essex District
Belden Bly (R) - 6,961 (51.1%)
Steven Angelo (D) - 6,643 (48.8%)

1980 Democratic primary for the Massachusetts House of Representatives, 9th Essex District
Steven Angelo - 1,777 (46.00%)
Lawrence Michael Means - 1,525 (39.5%)
Christie Serino - 561 (14.5%)

1980 General Election for the Massachusetts House of Representatives, 9th Essex District
Steven Angelo (D) - 10,710 (68.2%)
Clayton W. Trefry (R) - 4,984 (31.8%)

1984 Democratic primary for the Massachusetts House of Representatives, 9th Essex District
Steven Angelo - 3,635 (71.6%)
Kathleen Ann Murphy - 1,439	(28.4%)

1990 General Election for the Massachusetts House of Representatives, 9th Essex District
Steven Angelo (D) - 9,474 (62.8%)
Robert H. Dawe, Jr. (R) - 5,607 (37.2%)

1992 Democratic primary for the Massachusetts House of Representatives, 9th Essex District
Steven Angelo - 5,416 (77.7%)
Albert J. DiNardo - 1,551 (22.3%)

1996 General Election for the Massachusetts House of Representatives, 9th Essex District
Steven Angelo (D) - 12,937 (71.3%)
Anthony Cogliano (R) - 5,201	(28.7%)

Saugus Town Manager
In February 1998, Angelo was selected to serve as temporary Town Manager of Saugus starting in July. He was appointed to the position permanently in December 1998. He continued serving as State Representative.

During his tenure as Saugus Town Manager, the town completed the renovation of Saugus Town Hall. Additionally, ground was broken and the new Public Safety Complex, combining the Police and Fire commands was completed. The facilities at Stackpole football field were rebuilt and the clubhouse was named for Edna Winslow who had been a vocal and enthusiastic supporter of Saugus High school sports. 

Angelo successfully led the effort to pass a tax override to plan and complete the building of a New Veterans Memorial School. 

Angelo also lobbied for and received state and federal funds to dredge the Saugus River, a project that had lingered since the 1960s.

In the four years he was town manager, Angelo had record surpluses (one million plus a fiscal year), improved the Town's bond rating, and increased the size of the town's stabilization fund. 

Angelo resigned from the job in August 2002 for "personal reasons".

In June 2003, the State Ethics Commission found that Angelo had used his position to secure preferential treatment for selectman Kelleher following Kelleher's January 4, 2002 traffic stop. The Commission decided not to pursue formal action against Angelo. Kelleher and Felix were each fined $2,000.

Winsted Town Manager
From December 2003–November 2005, Angelo served as Town Manager of Winsted, Connecticut. During that period, Angelo was successful in cleaning up Highland Lake and successfully dealt with a large deficit in the budget he inherited.  He also was successful in passing a small capital outlay budget to deal with Winsted's deteriorating infrastructure.  He resigned on November 9, 2005, citing his health.

Atkinson Town Administrator
On September 15, 2008, he was hired to serve as the Town Administrator of Atkinson, New Hampshire. He resigned on January 21, 2009 due to his reluctance to sell his home in Falmouth, Massachusetts and family issues.

See also
 1989–1990 Massachusetts legislature

References

1952 births
Democratic Party members of the Massachusetts House of Representatives
Politicians from Somerville, Massachusetts
People from Saugus, Massachusetts
People from Falmouth, Massachusetts
Merrimack College alumni
Living people
Town Managers of Saugus, Massachusetts